Acorn barnacle and acorn shell are vernacular names for certain types of stalkless barnacles, generally excluding stalked or gooseneck barnacles. As adults they are typically cone-shaped, symmetrical, and attached to rocks or other fixed objects in the ocean. Members of the barnacle order Balanomorpha are often called acorn barnacles.

In addition, several species of barnacles are specifically called by the common name "acorn barnacle", including:
 Balanus glandula, Common Acorn Barnacle
 Balanus nubilus, Giant Acorn Barnacle
 Chthamalus antennatus, Acorn Barnacle
 Megabalanus coccopoma, Titan Acorn Barnacle
 Megabalanus tintinnabulum, Titan Acorn Barnacle
 Paraconcavus pacificus, Red-striped Acorn Barnacle
 Semibalanus balanoides, Northern Acorn Barnacle

References

Animal common names